Glorified rice is a dessert salad popular in the Midwestern cuisine served in Minnesota and other states in the Upper Midwest, United States and other places with Norwegian populations. It is popular in more rural areas with sizable Lutheran populations of Scandinavian heritage. It is made from rice, crushed pineapple, and whipped cream. It is often decorated with maraschino cherries.

History
The long-established recipe has been the subject of many newspaper articles. In 1995, Janet Letnes Martin and Suzann Nelson authored a humorous book comparing Lutheran and Catholic traditions called They Glorified Mary…We Glorified Rice: A Catholic-Lutheran Lexicon. The book includes a recipe for glorified rice. The dish is also included in the title of Carrie Young's Prairie Cooks: Glorified Rice, Three-Day Buns, and Other Recipes and Reminiscences.  Glorified rice often turns up at potlucks and church picnics.

See also
 Jello salad
 Watergate salad
 Snickers salad
 Cookie salad
 Midwestern cuisine
 Ambrosia (fruit salad)
 Risalamande, similar dish in Danish and other Scandinavian cuisine
 List of salads

References

Cuisine of the Midwestern United States
North Dakota culture
South Dakota culture
Cuisine of Wisconsin
American rice dishes
Salads
Cuisine of Minnesota
American desserts